The Palawan pencil-tailed tree mouse (Chiropodomys calamianensis)  is a species of arboreal rodent in the family Muridae. It is known from lowland forest near sea level, coconut groves, and bamboo thickets. It is endemic to the Palawan Faunal Region in the Philippines. It has been recorded on Balabac, Busuanga, Palawan, Dumaran, and Calauit islands.

References

Chiropodomys
Rats of Asia
Rodents of the Philippines
Endemic fauna of the Philippines
Fauna of Palawan
Mammals described in 1934
Taxa named by Edward Harrison Taylor
Taxonomy articles created by Polbot